Milky Wimpshake are a Lo-fi indie punk three-piece from Newcastle, who originally consisted of Ms. Joey Ramone (replacement, Grant by 1997), Christine, and Pete Dale.

Discography 

 Songs of Zoom and Buzz (1994)
 Bus Route to Your Heart (1997)
 Lovers Not Fighters (2002)
 Popshaped (2005)
 My Funny Social Crime (2010)
 Heart and Soul in the Milky Way (2013)
 Encore, Un Effort (2015)
 Confessions of an English Marxist (2020)

References

English punk rock groups
English indie rock groups